Kalpana-1 was the first dedicated meteorological satellite launched by Indian Space Research Organisation using Polar Satellite Launch Vehicle on 12 September 2002. The METSAT bus was used as the basis for the Chandrayaan lunar orbiter mission of 2008.

History
Originally known as MetSat-1, the satellite was the first launched by the PSLV-C4 into the Geostationary orbit. On February 5, 2003, it was renamed to Kalpana-1 by the Indian Prime Minister Atal Bihari Vajpayee in memory of Kalpana Chawla—an Indian born NASA astronaut who perished in the  disaster.

Its mission were to collect data in layer of clouds, water vapor, and temperature of the atmosphere and to establish a small satellite I-1000 bus system which can meet the exclusive service requirements of a meteorological payload for earth imageries

Kalpana-1 went out of service in mid-2018.

VHRR scanning radiometer
The three band images are:
 Visible
 Thermal infrared 
 Water vapour infrared

See also
 
 2002 in spaceflight
 List of Indian satellites

References

Earth observation satellites of India
Spacecraft launched in 2002
Kalpana Chawla
Spacecraft launched by PSLV rockets
ISRO satellites